Margriet E. Tindemans (March 26, 1951 – December 31, 2014) was a musician, specializing in medieval music.

The fourth child of Wilhelmina Coenen and Henricus Tindemans, Margriet demonstrated her musical talents early, and was named first violin in the National Youth Orchestra of the Netherlands.  After Conservatory studies in Maastricht, then Brussels, Belgium, and Basel, Switzerland, she became an early member of Sequentia.  She toured with that group for nine years until relocating to Seattle in 1986.  There she founded the Medieval Women’s Choir, was an artist in residence at the University of Washington, served as director of the Port Townsend Early Music Workshop, and was a faculty member of the Cornish College of the Arts.

Ensembles
 Sequentia
 Royal Dutch Opera
 Newberry Consort
 The King's Noyse (archive from 29 June 2009)
 The Folger Consort
 Seattle Baroque Orchestra
 Medieval Women’s Choir
 Pacific MusicWorks

References

Dutch performers of early music
Viol players
1951 births
2014 deaths
Women performers of early music
People from Nederweert
Cornish College of the Arts faculty
University of Washington people
20th-century Dutch musicians
20th-century American women musicians
21st-century Dutch musicians
21st-century American women musicians
20th-century classical musicians
American women academics